Symposia is a genus of South American araneomorph spiders in the family Cybaeidae, and was first described by Eugène Simon in 1898.

Species
 it contains six species in Venezuela and Colombia:
Symposia bifurca Roth, 1967 – Venezuela
Symposia columbiana Müller & Heimer, 1988 – Colombia
Symposia dubiosa Roth, 1967 – Venezuela
Symposia sexoculata Roth, 1967 – Venezuela
Symposia silvicola Simon, 1898 (type) – Venezuela
Symposia umbrosa Simon, 1898 – Venezuela

References

External links 

Araneomorphae genera
Cybaeidae
Taxa named by Eugène Simon